The Upemba shrew (Crocidura zimmeri) is a species of shrew in the family Soricidae. It is endemic to Democratic Republic of the Congo.  Its natural habitat is swamp.

Sources
 Hutterer, R. & Howell, K. 2004.  Crocidura zimmeri.   2006 IUCN Red List of Threatened Species.   Downloaded on 30 July 2007.

Upemba shrew
Mammals of the Democratic Republic of the Congo
Endemic fauna of the Democratic Republic of the Congo
Upemba shrew
Taxa named by Wilfred Hudson Osgood
Taxonomy articles created by Polbot
Central Zambezian miombo woodlands